Sketch comedy comprises a series of short, amusing scenes or vignettes, called "sketches", commonly between one and ten minutes long, performed by a group of comic actors or comedians. The form developed and became popular in vaudeville, and is used widely in variety shows, comedy talk shows, and some sitcoms and children's television series. The sketches may be improvised live by the performers, developed through improvisation before public performance, or scripted and rehearsed in advance like a play. Sketch comedians routinely differentiate their work from a "skit", maintaining that a skit is a (single) dramatized joke (or "bit") while a sketch is a comedic exploration of a concept, character, or situation.

History
Sketch comedy has its origins in vaudeville and music hall, where many brief humorous acts were strung together to form a larger programme.

In Britain, it moved to stage performances by Cambridge Footlights, such as Beyond the Fringe and A Clump of Plinths (which evolved into Cambridge Circus), to radio, with such shows as It's That Man Again and I'm Sorry, I'll Read That Again, then to television, with such shows as Not Only... But Also, Monty Python's Flying Circus, Not the Nine O'Clock News (and its successor Alas Smith and Jones), and A Bit of Fry and Laurie.

An early, perhaps the first, televised example of a sketch comedy show is Texaco Star Theater aka The Milton Berle Show 1948–1967, hosted by Milton Berle
In Mexico, the series Los Supergenios de la Mesa Cuadrada, created by Mexican comedian Roberto Gómez Bolaños under the stage name Chespirito, was broadcast between 1968 and 1973, creating such famous characters as El Chavo del Ocho and El Chapulín Colorado.

While separate sketches historically have tended to be unrelated, more recent groups have introduced overarching themes that connect the sketches within a particular show with recurring characters that return for more than one appearance. Examples of recurring characters include Mr. Gumby from Monty Python's Flying Circus; Ted and Ralph from The Fast Show; The Family from The Carol Burnett Show; the Head Crusher from The Kids in the Hall; Martin Short's Ed Grimley, a recurring character from both SCTV and Saturday Night Live; The Nerd from Robot Chicken;  and Kevin and Perry from Harry Enfield and Chums. Recurring characters from Saturday Night Live have notably been featured in a number of spinoff films, including The Blues Brothers (1980), Wayne's World (1992) and Superstar (1999).

The idea of running characters was taken a step further with shows like The Red Green Show and The League of Gentlemen, where sketches centered on the various inhabitants of the fictional towns of Possum Lake and Royston Vasey, respectively. In Little Britain, sketches focused on a cast of recurring characters.

In North America, contemporary sketch comedy is largely an outgrowth of the improvisational comedy scene that flourished during the 1970s, largely growing out of The Second City in Chicago and Toronto, which was built upon the success in Minneapolis of The Brave New Workshop and Dudley Riggs.

Notable contemporary American stage sketch comedy groups include The Second City, the Upright Citizens Brigade, and The Groundlings. In South Bend, Indiana, area high school students produced a sketch comedy series called Beyond Our Control that aired on the local NBC affiliate WNDU-TV from 1967 to 1986.

Warner Bros. Animation made two sketch comedy shows, Mad and Right Now Kapow.

Films
An early British example is the influential The Running Jumping & Standing Still Film (1959).
Sketch films made during the 1970s and 1980s include If You Don't Stop It... You'll Go Blind and the sequel Can I Do It... 'Til I Need Glasses?, The Groove Tube, Everything You Always Wanted to Know About Sex* (*But Were Afraid to Ask), The Kentucky Fried Movie and its sequel Amazon Women on the Moon, and Monty Python's And Now for Something Completely Different and The Meaning of Life.

More recent sketch films include The Underground Comedy Movie, InAPPropriate Comedy, Movie 43 and Livrés chez vous sans contact.

Festivals
Many of the sketch comedy revues in Britain included seasons at the Edinburgh Fringe Festival.

Since 1999, the growing sketch comedy scene has precipitated the development of sketch comedy festivals in cities all around North America. Noted festivals include:
Chicago Sketch Fest
SF Sketchfest
Toronto Sketch Comedy Festival

See also
British Comedy Awards
List of sketch comedy groups
List of sketch comedy television series
Nininbaori
List of recurring Saturday Night Live characters and sketches
Saturday Night Live TV show sketches
Brave New Workshop

References

 
 
Television genres